State Bank of Patiala, founded in 1917, was an associate bank of the State Bank Group. It merged with State Bank of India on 1 April 2017. At the time of its merger, State Bank of Patiala had a network of 1445 service outlets, including 1314 branches, in all major cities of India, but most of the branches were located in the Indian states of Punjab, Haryana, Himachal Pradesh, Rajasthan, Jammu & Kashmir, Uttar Pradesh, Madhya Pradesh, Delhi, Gujarat and Maharashtra.

History
State Bank of Patiala, founded in 1917, was an associate bank of the State Bank Group. It ...
Headquarters: Head Office, The Mall, Patiala 147 002 India
Number of employees: 13178 
His Highness Bhupinder Singh, Maharaja of Patiala State, founded the Patiala State Bank on 17 November 1917 to foster growth of agriculture, trade, and industry. The bank combined the functions of a commercial bank and those of a central bank for the princely state of Patiala. The bank had one branch at Chowk Fort, Patiala,  Undivided India.

The formation of the Patiala and East Punjab States Union in 1948 led to the bank being reorganized, being brought under the control of the Reserve Bank of India, and being renamed Bank of Patiala. On 1 April 1960 Bank of Patiala became a subsidiary of State Bank of India and was renamed State Bank of Patiala.

Logo and slogan 
The logo of the State Bank of Patiala is a blue circle with a small cut in the bottom that depicts perfection and the small man the common man – being the center of the bank's business. The logo came from National Institute of Design (NID), Ahmedabad, and it was inspired by Kankaria Lake, Ahmedabad.

See also 

 Banking in India
 List of banks in India

References 

State Bank of India
Banks established in 1917
Organisations based in Patiala
Defunct banks of India
Indian companies established in 1917
Indian companies disestablished in 2017
Banks disestablished in 2017
Companies listed on the National Stock Exchange of India
Companies listed on the Bombay Stock Exchange